Brian Wilshire (born 30 March 1944 in Strathfield, Sydney, Australia) is a retired  radio broadcaster for 2GB Sydney. He hosted the 'Australia overnight' programme (12:00am – 3.30 am) up until 11 December 2015.  The signature of the show was the tune, "Hanky Panky", by Pete Fountain.

Brian Wilshire began his radio career in November 1969 at 2NZ in Inverell. . He won almost every survey at 2GB for 36 years.

Wilshire has many interests including snow skiing, car racing (having won his class in 1993 at Bathurst), writing books (his The Fine Print was Australia's best-selling book in 1992 — source: Dymock's, Who Magazine), and playing drums in bands "Stringybark" and "Koala Soup".

Wilshire has previously expressed sceptical views on mainstream climate change science.

Controversy over racial comments

On 16 December 2005, Wilshire was forced to make a public apology, after allegedly saying on air that many Middle Eastern immigrants were inbred as a result of consanguinity and thus hard to educate.

"Many of them (referring to the carloads of youths who invaded the Sutherland Shire following the Cronulla riots) have parents who are first cousins whose parents were first cousins. The result of this is inbreeding – the result of which is uneducationable (sic) people...and very low IQ.”
At no stage during the discussion was there any mention of the race of the rioters. The media assumed Wilshire was talking about Lebanese.

His comments were met with outrage. "It reveals an uneducated comment on his part – they are disgraceful comments," then Premier, Morris Iemma, said.

Stephen Stanton, spokesman for the Lebanese human rights organisation Cedarwatch:

"One is [Sydney radio] 2GB and the moronic manner that gargling boofhead has been berating and denigrating you. The airwaves are useless if they are used by people such as that. The other is newspapers such as The Australian."

Following condemnation, including by Premier Iemma, Wilshire has since apologised for his comments.
He has since returned to 2GB Overnights in about May 2016, only about five months after retiring.

Referencing the 2gb.com website as of 22 November 2018, Wilshire is no longer working with the radio station in any capacity.

Bibliography

The Fine Print: Australia's Special Role in the New World Order (1992)
Fine Print 2 (1993)
"One Man Banned" (1996) with Peter Sawyer
Monday School: What They Didn't Teach You in Sunday School (1996)

References

External links
 News report about his controversial comments

1944 births
Australian non-fiction writers
Conservative talk radio people
Australian radio personalities
Living people
People from Sydney
People educated at Barker College
Former 2GB presenters